The overthrow of Slobodan Milošević in Belgrade, Yugoslavia, began after the presidential election on 24 September and culminated in the downfall of Slobodan Milošević's government on 5 October 2000.

Prelude
Milošević's rule has been described by observers as authoritarian or autocratic, as well as kleptocratic, with numerous accusations of electoral frauds, political assassinations, suppression of media freedom and police brutality. He became the first sitting head of state to be charged with war crimes. His role in the Yugoslav Wars led to international sanctions against Yugoslavia, which had a devastating impact on the Yugoslav economy and society, while NATO bombing significantly damaged the country's infrastructure. While the overthrow of Milošević was reported as a spontaneous revolution, there had been a year-long battle involving thousands of Serbs in a strategy to strip the leader of his legitimacy, turn his security forces against him, and force him to call for elections, the result of which he would not acknowledge.

In 1998, a dozen students met to form Otpor! (Serbian for "resistance"). Analysing the mistakes of the 1996–97 protests, they realised they needed more effective organisation, strategy, planning, recruiting, and all else necessary for a sustained fight. Galvanised by outrage over new laws that imposed political control of their universities and harassment of independent media, the Otpor students called for the removal of Milošević and the establishment of democracy and the rule of law.

Prior to this, Milošević was cracking down on opposition, non-government organisations and independent media. From 1991 onwards there were campaigns of civil resistance against his administration that were to culminate in the largely non-violent revolution of October 2000. As the end of his first term in office of the president of Yugoslavia approached (previously, he had been elected president of Serbia, in two terms, from 1989 to 1997), on 6 July 2000, the rules of the election of the president were changed. Whilst the president of Yugoslavia had previously been chosen for one term only by the legislature, in the Yugoslav parliament, it was now to be directly elected via the two-round voting system of presidential elections with a maximum of two terms. Many onlookers believed that Milošević's intentions for supporting such reforms had more to do with holding power than with improving democracy. On 27 July 2000, the authorities announced that the early elections were to be held 24 September 2000, although Milošević's term wouldn't expire until 23 July 2001. The elections for the upper house of the federal parliament, Council of Citizens (Veće građana), as well as the local elections were also scheduled to be held on the same date.

On 25 August 2000, Ivan Stambolić, a former mentor and political ally of Milošević, was mysteriously kidnapped and detained from his home and was summarily executed in Fruška Gora. The hit was believed to have been initiated by Milošević so he could prevent Stambolić from being a potential electoral opponent. His decomposed body was found three years later in March 2003. The four officers who had kidnapped him were sentenced. Milošević was charged for initiating the assassination.

Soon after the announcement, the anti-government youth movement Otpor! led the campaign to topple the administration and introduce a transparent democracy. To unify opposition, eighteen parties in Serbia formed the Democratic Opposition of Serbia (DOS) coalition, with Vojislav Koštunica as the candidate to confront Milošević. Apart from this, two major opposition parties, Serbian Radical Party and Serbian Renewal Movement also had candidates (Tomislav Nikolić and Vojislav Mihailović, respectively), but the main battle of the elections was the one between Milošević and Koštunica. The election campaign lasted for about two months and was extremely tense, with numerous incidents, accusations of treason, independent media shutdowns and even murders.

For a year leading up to the elections, the United States-funded consultants played a crucial role in the anti-Milošević campaign. The key symbol of the campaign was the slogan Gotov je! (meaning "He is finished!"), created by Otpor!. Part of the U.S. funding of the opposition (a reported $41 million) included 2.5 million stickers with the slogan and 5,000 spray cans for anti-Milošević graffiti. Material was channeled by the U.S. Department of State through QUANGOs.

Elections

The vote took place on 24 September 2000. The DOS coalition reported that Vojislav Koštunica won over half of the votes, enough to defeat Milošević in a single round. The government-controlled Federal Electoral Committee claimed that no candidate won over 50% of the votes and that a second round between Koštunica and Milošević would take place. The vote was largely boycotted in Montenegro and by Kosovo Albanians (not under Yugoslavian control). Yet, Milošević officially won by a large margin in these parts of the country. These unexpected results provoked stronger accusations of election fraud and led DOS to call for peaceful protests to topple the government.

Some obvious irregularities could be found in the Federal Electoral Committee official results. For example, the sum of the numbers of valid and invalid votes was not equal to the number of voters; the sum of the numbers of the voters voting at the polling stations and the voters voting at home exceeded the total number of voters; the sum of the numbers of the used and the unused ballot papers was short by 117,244 in comparison to the number of eligible voters, the number of eligible voters was different from the one announced before the elections and has differed in the presidential, federal and local elections results, etc.

All of these discrepancies provoked massive outrage. The results were declared false immediately after Milošević was removed, and revised official results were released shortly afterwards. The new results were practically the same, except for the number of total votes and the votes for Milošević, both of which were lower by 125,000–130,000 votes, thus giving Koštunica an absolute, if narrow, first-round victory; Koštunica finished with just a few thousand votes over the threshold to avoid a runoff.

Protests and overthrow
The protests initially started with strikers at the Kolubara mines on 29 September, which produced most of Serbia's electricity. The protest reached its height on 5 October 2000. Several hundred thousand protesters from all over Serbia arrived in Belgrade to protest, chanting "He's finished! He's finished!" Unlike previous protests, there was no large scale police crackdown. The parliament was partially burned during the protests.

The protest is frequently named the "Bulldozer Revolution" after one of the most memorable episodes from the day-long protest in which heavy equipment operator Ljubisav Đokić, nicknamed Joe, fired up his machine – actually neither an excavator nor a bulldozer, but rather a wheel loader – and used it to charge a Belgrade building.

Đokić died 11 July 2020. Its tenant, Serbian state television RTS, had for a decade been a symbol and bastion of Milošević's rule. When their studios were taken over, the station was quickly renamed Novi RTS ("New RTS") as a sign that the regime had lost power.

Although the protest was mostly peaceful, without a larger escalation of violence, 65 people were injured in the riots and two people died:
 Jasmina Jovanović fell under a wheel loader or, according to other sources, a truck.
 Momčilo Stakić succumbed to a fatal heart attack.

In the time between elections and the protest, Milošević said that he would gladly resign but only when his term expired in June 2001. Due to pressure caused by the protests, Milošević resigned on 5 October 2000.

Aftermath
A DOS victory was guaranteed in parliamentary elections in December, where they achieved a two-thirds majority. On 1 April 2001, Milošević was detained by Serbian police and later transferred to The Hague to be prosecuted by the ICTY. He died in his cell on 11 March 2006, a few months before the conclusion of his four-year trial.

See also

Nonviolent revolution
Anti-bureaucratic revolution
March 1991 protests in Belgrade
1996–1997 protests in Serbia

Annotations

References

Further reading

Books
 
 
 

Journals

External links

 

 
2000 in Serbia
2000 protests
2000 riots
2000s in Belgrade
20th-century revolutions
 
Events in Belgrade
October 2000 events in Europe
Protests against results of elections
Protests in Serbia
Riots and civil disorder in Serbia
Student protests in Serbia